State Route 386 (SR 386) is a major east–west state route, signed north-south, located in Davidson and Sumner counties in Tennessee. It is known as Vietnam Veterans Boulevard and serves as a bypass for U.S. Highway 31E (US 31E) and a connector to Hendersonville and Gallatin from Nashville. A majority of the route is a four-lane controlled-access highway.

Route description
SR 386 begins at a two-way partial Y interchange with Interstate 65 (I-65) in Davidson County north of Nashville. The route is only accessible from I-65 northbound, and I-65 northbound is not directly accessible from SR 386 westbound. The route begins with a  speed limit in Davidson County, which reduces to  upon entering Sumner County less than  later. About  later the route has a trumpet interchange with a connector to US 31E, signed as US 31E. The route then curves slightly to the southeast and enters the central part of Hendersonville and has interchanges with SR 258 (New Shackle Island Road), Indian Lake Boulevard, and Saundersville Road, before coming to a partial y interchange with US 31E in what was originally the eastern terminus of the route. As a result, SR 386 curves sharply to the north, crossing US 31E and a CSX railroad again, and curves to the northeast again, and enters a mix of an urban and rural area, coming to an interchange with Big Station Camp Boulevard about  later. SR 386 then has an interchange with Green Lea Boulevard, and about  later it reaches an at-grade intersection with SR 174, where SR 386 runs concurrently with SR 174. The road becomes an undivided four-lane highway. They continue east into Gallatin, and about a mile later connects to SR 109 via an interchange, where SR 386 becomes unsigned. SR 174/SR 386 then become two lanes as they pass through several neighborhoods before coming to a y-intersection and running concurrently with SR 25. They then continue to the western edge of downtown, where SR 386 comes to an at an intersection with US 31E/SR 6.

US 31E hidden designation

From exit 2 to exit 9, SR 386 carries a hidden US 31E Bypass designation.

History
The route that is now SR 386 was originally proposed to provide more convenient means of transportation to Nashville for residents of Hendersonville, which had grown significantly in the 1960s and 1970s. The Hendersonville Transportation Study of 1978 listed 35 priority projects with the section through Hendersonville as number 1 and the connection to I-65 as number 2. A 1980 transportation study conducted for Nashville and Davidson County initiated the project.

Construction began on the first section, located in Hendersonville, in March 1981. This section, located between SR 258 (New Shackle Island Road) and US 31E, was completed in 1983, and the section between the US 31E connector and SR 258 was completed in 1987. These sections were initially referred to as the Hendersonville Bypass. Construction began on the extension to I-65 in 1988. The segment between Two Mile Pike and Conference Drive was opened on April 5, 1990, and the final leg of the original bypass was opened to traffic on October 4, 1990.

Beginning in 2003, the highway was extended east to Gallatin in two separate projects after that city experienced further growth and transportation needs. This was completed on June 15, 2007.

In 2010 TDOT began studying the possibility of extending the route further east into Gallatin. Also that year the speed limit was reduced from 70 to 65 mph in Sumner County and warning signs were installed around the curve near US 31E in an effort to improve safety on the highway that had developed a high rate of traffic accidents. Early into the route's history it began to experience congestion problems during rush hour. Future plans including widening the highway to six lanes.

On December 1, 2011, a 176 vehicle pileup on SR 386 near the easternmost exit with US 31E resulted in two deaths and 16 injuries. Dense fog and black ice were believed to have contributed to the cause of the accident.

In 1987, SR 386 was renamed the Vietnam Veterans Boulevard after the efforts of the Sumner County chapter of the Vietnam Veterans of America. In 2012 the chapter worked with the Tennessee General Assembly to install signs along the highway, located each about a half mile apart, that list the names of the 25 Sumner County residents who died in the Vietnam War.

Exit list

References

386
Freeways in Tennessee
Transportation in Davidson County, Tennessee
Transportation in Sumner County, Tennessee

External links